Charles Blish Winder, Jr. (June 23, 1874 – March 5, 1921) was an American sport shooter, who competed in the 1908 Summer Olympics. He was a colonel in the Ohio Army National Guard.

Biography
He was born in Wayne Township, Champaign County, Ohio on June 23, 1874.

He was the winner of the Leech Cup in 1903 in Sea Girt, New Jersey.

In the 1908 Olympics he won a gold medal in the team military rifle event and was 16th in 1000 yard free rifle event.

He died in West Palm Beach, Florida on March 5, 1921.

References

External links
Charles Winder's profile at databaseOlympics

1874 births
1921 deaths
American male sport shooters
ISSF rifle shooters
Shooters at the 1908 Summer Olympics
Olympic gold medalists for the United States in shooting
Olympic medalists in shooting
Leech Cup
Medalists at the 1908 Summer Olympics
People from Champaign County, Ohio